Tillandsia supermexicana is a species of flowering plant in the genus Tillandsia. This species is endemic to Mexico.

References

supermexicana
Endemic flora of Mexico